The Computer Society of Sri Lanka (CSSL)  is a professional body and learned society that represents those working in information technology (IT) and computer science in Sri Lanka. It was founded in 1976 and incorporated in 1986 under the Companies Act, No. 17 of 1982.

Governance
The CSSL is governed by an executive council that consists of a President, Vice President, Secretary, Treasurer, Assistant Secretary, Assistant Treasurer, Student Counselor, Publication Secretary and several committee members. The executive council is elected at the annual general meeting of the society.

Grades of membership
CSSL has different grades of membership:
 Honorary Fellow Members
 Members (MCS)
 Associate Members
 Student Members
 Affiliate Members

Projects organised by the CSSL
The CSSL organises regular events for the benefit of the ICT community of Sri Lanka, and key among them are the following projects;
 National IT Conference (NITC)
 National Schools' Software Competition (NSSC)
 IT MasterMind National Schools' Quiz Competition
 IT Blast / Membership Night, a Dinner Dance for the ICT Fraternity
 CSSL Awards - An Annual Award Ceremony where key individuals and contributors are awarded and recognised.

Affiliations
 Information and Communication Technology Agency of Sri Lanka (ICTA)
 International Computer Driving Licence (ICDL)
 South East Asian Regional Computer Confederation (SEARCC)
 Organisation for Professional Associations of Sri Lanka (OPA)
 Australian Computer Society

References

External links
Official web site of Computer Society of Sri Lank

Professional associations based in Sri Lanka
Learned societies of Sri Lanka
Information technology in Sri Lanka
Computer science organizations
Organizations established in 1976